Čížkov may refer to:

Čížkov (Pelhřimov District), a village and municipality (obec) in Pelhřimov District in the Vysočina Region of the Czech Republic
Čížkov (Plzeň-South District), a village and municipality (obec) in Plzeň-South District in the Plzeň Region of the Czech Republic